Mount Nagata is a mostly snow-covered mountain rising to 2,140 m, located 2 nautical miles (3.7 km) east of Mount Gow in the Bowers Mountains. Named by Advisory Committee on Antarctic Names (US-ACAN) in 1984 after Takesi Nagata (1913–91), pioneer in the study of paleomagnetism; Director, National Institute of Polar Research (Japan).

References 

Mountains of Victoria Land
Pennell Coast